ICST may refer to:

 Information and Communication Science and Technology Department, at École nationale supérieure de techniques avancées Bretagne, France
International Center for the Study of Terrorism at Pennsylvania State University, U.S.
International Commission of Science and Technology, Dominican Republic
Institute for Computer Sciences, Social Informatics and Telecommunications Engineering, a non-profit professional association